César Daniel Garipe (born 7 May 1981 in San Juan, Argentina) is an Argentine former professional footballer who played as a midfielder.

Born in San Juan, Argentina, Garipe began playing club football with Juventud Alianza. At age 18, he joined Club Atlético Huracán and made an appearance for the Argentina national under-20 football team against England at Wembley Stadium. Garipe signed for New York/New Jersey MetroStars in 2005.

Clubs
 Juventud Alianza 1997
 Huracán 1998–2002
 Lanús 2003
 Argentinos Juniors 2004
 Pontevedra 2004
 Godoy Cruz 2005
 Juventud Alianza 2006
 Godoy Cruz 2007–2008
 Independiente Rivadavia 2009–2010
 Everton 2010

References

External links
 

1981 births
Living people
Argentine footballers
Association football midfielders
Juventud Alianza players
Independiente Rivadavia footballers
Argentinos Juniors footballers
Club Atlético Lanús footballers
Club Atlético Huracán footballers
Godoy Cruz Antonio Tomba footballers
Everton de Viña del Mar footballers
Argentine expatriate footballers
Argentine expatriate sportspeople in Spain
Expatriate footballers in Spain
Argentine expatriate sportspeople in Chile
Expatriate footballers in Chile
People from San Juan, Argentina
Sportspeople from San Juan Province, Argentina